Chance is the 23rd book in Robert B. Parker's  Spenser series and first published in 1996.

Spenser investigates the disappearance of the husband of mafia princess Shirley Meeker.

References

Spenser (novel series)
1996 American novels
Novels about organized crime in the United States